Stenus semicolon is a species of water skater in the beetle family Staphylinidae.

References

Further reading

 

Steninae
Articles created by Qbugbot